The Slovak Extraliga 2004–05 was the twelfth regular season of the Slovak Extraliga, the top level of professional ice hockey in Slovakia. During the 2004–05 NHL lockout several Slovak players returned to their homeland, including Pavol Demitra, Marián Hossa, Marián Gáborík (all in HK Dukla Trenčín), Miroslav Šatan and Ľubomír Višňovský (both in HC Slovan Bratislava), Michal Handzuš, Richard Zedník and Vladimír Országh (all in HKm Zvolen), Ladislav Nagy and Martin Štrbák (both in HC Košice), and Žigmund Pálffy (in HK 36 Skalica).

Regular season

Final standings

Key - GP: Games played, W: Wins, OTW: Over time wins, T: Ties, OTL: Over time losses, L: Losses, GF: Goals for, GA: Goals against, PTS: Points.

Playoffs

Playoff bracket

Playout

* Dubnica sold license for the 2005-06 season to Martin due to financial troubles.

Scoring Leaders

Regular season

Key - GP: Games played, G: Goals, A: Assists, PTS: Points.

Play-off

2004-05 All Star Team

External links
 Slovak Ice Hockey Federation
 Hockey Archives

2004-05
Slovak
2004–05 in European ice hockey leagues